Carl Stefan Erling Persson (born 4 October 1947) is a Swedish billionaire businessman. In March 2013, Forbes reported Persson's net worth as $28 billion making him the richest of Sweden's 12 billionaires and the 17th richest person in the world; he has since dropped to number 50. Persson was the chairman of fashion company H&M until May 2020, when he was succeeded by his son. He remains the company's largest shareholder, owning a 36% stake. The company was founded by his father Erling Persson in 1947.

Persson took over H&M from his father in 1982 and served as its manager until 1998.  He also owns a substantial stake in the Swedish technology company Hexagon AB. Through his privately held real estate company Ramsbury Invest, Persson owns a large number of properties in London, Paris and Stockholm.

He is the sole director of Ramsbury Estates Limited, which farms  in the English counties of Wiltshire, Berkshire and Hampshire, centred on the village of Ramsbury in Wiltshire. Since Persson acquired the business in 1997, it has bought the land of several neighbouring estates including Littlecote and Hungerford Park.

According to Bloomberg Billionaires Index, Persson had a net worth of US$21.2 billion in January 2022, making him the 89th richest person in the world at the time.

Early life
Stefan Persson is the son of Erling Persson, who founded H&M in 1947. He earned an associate qualification from Stockholm University.

Personal life
Persson is a founder of the Mentor Foundation, a non-profit organisation that aims to combat substance abuse among young people. He is a supporter of Djurgårdens IF and is co-funding a foundation for the club. Persson enjoys downhill skiing, tennis and golf. He owns properties in London, Paris and Stockholm and, in 2009, acquired the 21-cottage village of Linkenholt in Hampshire, England.

Persson has three children from his first marriage, to Pamela Collett. In 2009, his son, Karl-Johan Persson, took over as president and chief executive of H&M. His other two children, Tom Persson and Charlotte Söderström are also billionaires.

Persson lives in Stockholm, Sweden, with his second wife, Denise Persson, née Florman.

References

Further reading
Biography (In Swedish) The Big Boss. Så tog Stefan Persson H&M ut i världen och blev Sveriges rikaste person. Erik Palm and Jonas Alsgren (2019). Norstedts 

1947 births
Swedish businesspeople in fashion
Businesspeople from Stockholm
Living people
Swedish billionaires
Stefan